Richard MacNeill (7 January 1898 in Pasuruan, Dutch East Indies – 3 June 1963 in Heemstede) was a football (soccer) goalkeeper from the Netherlands, who represented his home country at the 1920 Summer Olympics. There he won the bronze medal with the Netherlands national football team.

MacNeill was also known as Robert MacNeill.

References

External links
  Dutch Olympic Committee
  Profile

1898 births
1963 deaths
Dutch footballers
Association football goalkeepers
Footballers at the 1920 Summer Olympics
Olympic footballers of the Netherlands
Olympic bronze medalists for the Netherlands
Netherlands international footballers
Olympic medalists in football
People from Pasuruan
Medalists at the 1920 Summer Olympics